Byjerk Parish is a remote civil Parish, of the County of Barrona, a cadasteral division of New South Wales.

Byjerk is on the Paroo River near Wanaaring, New South Wales.
The topography is the flat and arid with a Köppen climate classification of BSk (Hot semi arid).

Byjerk is the only part of Barrona County that is unincorporated.

References

Localities in New South Wales
Geography of New South Wales
Populated places in New South Wales
Far West (New South Wales)